George Montgomery (born George Montgomery Letz; August 27, 1916 – December 12, 2000) was an American actor, best known for his work in Western films and television.  He was also a painter, director, producer, writer, sculptor, furniture craftsman, and stuntman.
He was married to Dinah Shore and was engaged to Hedy Lamarr.

Early years
Montgomery was born George Montgomery Letz in 1916, the youngest of 15 children of Ukrainian immigrant parents, from Mykolaiv in southern Ukraine. He was born in Brady, in Pondera County, northern Montana near Great Falls. He was reared on a large ranch, where he learned to ride horses and work cattle as a part of daily life.

Letz boxed as a heavyweight for a short while before enrolling in the University of Montana in Missoula. He was active in school athletics and majored in interior design, but he left after one year.

Career
Montgomery was more interested in a career in film than in a college education. Therefore, he left Montana for Hollywood. Two days after his arrival there, he was working as a stunt man on a Greta Garbo film at MGM, Conquest (1937).

Republic Pictures
At Republic Pictures, his cowboy skills gained him stunt work and a small acting part at the age of 18 in a 1935 Gene Autry film, The Singing Vagabond.

He followed this with bit parts and additional stunt work as "George Letz" in mostly low-budget films. These included Springtime in the Rockies (1937) with Autry; The Purple Vigilantes (1938) with Robert Livingston; the serial The Lone Ranger (1938); Outlaws of Sonora (1938) with Livingston; The Old Barn Dance (1938) and Gold Mine in the Sky (1938) with Autry; Under Western Stars (1938), with Roy Rogers; Shine On, Harvest Moon (1938) with Rogers.

Those had all been Westerns. He was in an African adventure tale Hawk of the Wilderness (1938) with Bruce Bennett (billed as Herman Brix, his real name) and the bigger-budgeted Army Girl (1938).

In 1938, he appeared as one of the six men suspected of being the titular hero in The Lone Ranger. That year, Life included him in a photo montage of "Hollywood's Movie-struck Kids" and described Montgomery, still using his full name, as "6 ft. 3 in. tall, weighs 210 lb., rides well, is superlatively handsome."

He went back to Westerns in Southward Ho (1939) and The Arizona Kid (1939) with Rogers. He was in some non-Westerns such as The Mysterious Miss X (1939), S.O.S. Tidal Wave (1939), and I Was a Convict (1939), but mostly it was films such as South of the Border (1939) and In Old Monterey (1939) with Autry, Saga of Death Valley (1939); Wall Street Cowboy (1939), Frontier Pony Express (1939), Rough Riders' Round-up (1939) and In Old Caliente (1939) with Rogers; The Night Riders (1939) with John Wayne. He worked on Republic's (relatively) big-budget Man of Conquest (1939).

20th Century Fox
In 1939, he signed with 20th Century Fox, which billed him as George Montgomery.

His first film at the studio was The Cisco Kid and the Lady (1939), the first of the Cisco Kid series. Montgomery was billed fourth. He had a small role in Star Dust (1940), and a bigger one in Young People (1940), Shirley Temple's last film for Fox.

Montgomery was fourth-billed in a "B" about pilots, Charter Pilot (1940) with Lloyd Nolan and Lynn Bari, and third-billed in Jennie (1940).

Leading man
Montgomery was promoted to leading roles in a melodrama written by Dalton Trumbo, Accent on Love (1941). Fox then starred him in some B Westerns: Last of the Duanes (1941), Riders of the Purple Sage (1941), and The Cowboy and the Blonde (1941).

Montgomery was teamed with Carole Landis in Cadet Girl (1941). He was given the lead in an "A" when he top-lined Orchestra Wives (1942) with Ann Rutherford, a film best remembered today for giving a co-star role to Glenn Miller.

He starred in Ten Gentlemen from West Point (1942) with Maureen O'Hara, playing a role originally intended for Tyrone Power.

He was Ginger Rogers' love interest in Roxie Hart (1942) and played opposite Gene Tierney in China Girl (1942) for Henry Hathaway. All these films were popular at the box office.

The following year, Montgomery starred with Betty Grable in the Walter Lang-directed film Coney Island, which was his biggest hit to date. According to one obituary, "The actor's vocal mannerisms were often uncannily reminiscent of Clark Gable, and when he grew a moustache his similarities to the greater star were even more apparent. This was never more so than in Coney Island.

He also starred in Bomber's Moon (1943).

World War II
Montgomery was announced for several films originally intended for Fox leading men Tyrone Power, who had joined the Marine Corps, and Henry Fonda, who had joined the Navy, including Down to the Sea in Ships and Bird of Paradise with Tierney. However, Montgomery wound up joining the U.S. Army Air Forces First Motion Picture Unit in 1943 where he appeared in such training films as Survival of the Fittest (1944).

He returned to Fox in 1946, and played the lead in a musical Three Little Girls in Blue (1946). Fox then cast him as Philip Marlowe in The Brasher Doubloon (1947), a B-picture version of the novel The High Window by Raymond Chandler.

Montgomery was unhappy at Fox. The song "This is Always", Montgomery's major duet (albeit dubbed) with June Haver in Three Little Girls in Blue, was cut, and he was assigned to a minor Western, Belle Starr's Daughter (1948). Montgomery left Fox in September 1947 unhappy with his roles.

Low-budget action star
Montgomery appeared in Lulu Belle (1948) and The Girl from Manhattan for Benedict Bogeaus.

In 1950, he starred as the title role in Davy Crockett, Indian Scout for Edward Small. He went back to Fox for Dakota Lil (1950) and made The Iroquois Trail (1950) and The Texas Rangers (1951) for Small.

Montgomery tried a swashbuckler at Fox, The Sword of Monte Cristo (1951), then returned to Small for Indian Uprising (1951) and Cripple Creek (1952), Gun Belt (1953), and The Lone Gun (1954). For Sam Katzman, he made The Pathfinder (1952), Fort Ti (1952), Jack McCall, Desperado (1953), The Battle of Rogue River (1954), and Seminole Uprising (1955).

Montgomery worked for other producers: Robbers' Roost (1955); Huk! (1956), a war movie shot in the Philippines; Canyon River (1956); Pawnee (1957); Black Patch (1957); Gun Duel in Durango (1957) for Small; Street of Sinners (1957) a rare non-Western; Last of the Badmen (1957); Man from God's Country (1958); The Toughest Gun in Tombstone (1958); and Badman's Country (1958) as Pat Garrett.

Television
In the 1958–59 season, Montgomery starred in his own 26-episode NBC Western series, Cimarron City as Mayor Matt Rockford, with co-stars John Smith and Audrey Totter through his own production company Mont Productions. Montgomery claimed to have turned down the lead roles in the Western television series Gunsmoke and Wagon Train. Cimarron City ran one season.

Montgomery made an Imperial adventure for MGM, Watusi (1959), a sequel to King Solomon's Mines (1950). He followed it with King of the Wild Stallions (1959).

He made guest appearances on a number of television shows, including NBC's Bonanza and The Gisele MacKenzie Show.

Director
Montgomery turned director with The Steel Claw (1961), a war film shot in the Philippines, which he also co-wrote and in which he starred.

He was in Samar (1962), From Hell to Borneo (1963), and Guerillas in Pink Lace (1964).

He was going to make Outlaw of Red River for Robert Lippert in Spain, but it appears to have not been made.

As an actor, he was in the filmed in Spain Battle of the Bulge (1965) and Django the Condemned (1966). He was in Hallucination Generation (1967) an anti-LSD movie. Montgomery was in Bomb at 10:10 (1967), Hostile Guns (1967), Warkill (1968), and Strangers at Sunrise (1970) (shot in South Africa). He also worked the dinner and stock theatre circuit, appearing in productions of Two for the Seesaw and  A Hole in the Head.

He planned to make a Vietnam War film The Ho Chi Minh Trail in Bangkok and the Philippines, but the film was cancelled.<ref>{{cite book|last1=Parish|first1=James Robert|last2= DeCarl|first2= Lennard|title=George Montgomery in Hollywood Players: The Forties|publisher=Arlington House Publishers| year=1976| page=390}}</ref>

1970s
Montgomery acted in and directed Satan's Harvest (1970) made in South Africa. He also starred in The Leo Chronicles (1972) and The Daredevil (1972) and helped produce The Proud and Damned (1972).

He also starred in the TV movie Ride the Tiger (1970) and made guest appearances on 1970s television shows including The Odd Couple and The Six Million Dollar Man.

Other interests
As a boy, George Montgomery had become an excellent wood craftsman. As an adult, he began building furniture, first for himself and then for a few friends. His skill was such that his hobby became a full-fledged cabinet-making business, in which he employed as many as 20 craftsmen. He appeared in television advertisements for Pledge furniture cleaner during the 1970s.

Montgomery oversaw the furniture business for more than 40 years, and expanded his interest to house design. He became involved with the building of 11 homes for friends and family. His artistic instincts included learning how to sculpt in bronze. Self-taught, he sculpted upwards of 50 bronze sculptures of subjects such as John Wayne, Clint Eastwood, Gene Autry, Randolph Scott, and Ronald W. Reagan. He received renown in particular for a sculpture he did of Custer's Last Stand.

His sculpture of his former wife, Dinah Shore, and their children is displayed at the Mission Hills Country Club in Rancho Mirage, California.

In 1981, he published a book The Years of George Montgomery.

Personal life
Montgomery was briefly engaged to Hedy Lamarr. 

Montgomery and singer Dinah Shore married on December 5, 1943. They had one child, Melissa Ann "Missy" Montgomery (born 1948). George and Dinah also adopted a son, John "Jody" David Montgomery, in 1954. They divorced in 1963. Missy Montgomery also became an actress. 

In 1963, Montgomery's private life made headlines when his housekeeper was charged in a failed attempt to kill him. Allegedly suffering from a fanatical attraction to her employer, the woman planned to shoot Montgomery, then commit suicide.

Montgomery died at home on December 12, 2000, aged 84. After cremation, Montgomery's ashes were divided and interred at Forest Lawn Cemetery (Cathedral City) near his Palm Springs home and at the Highland Cemetery in Great Falls, Montana, near his birthplace.

Legacy
For his contribution to the television industry, George Montgomery has a star on the Hollywood Walk of Fame at 6301 Hollywood Blvd. In 1995, a Golden Palm Star on the Palm Springs Walk of Stars was dedicated in his honor. He is also honored with a statue in the square of Plentywood, Montana.

Filmography

 The Singing Vagabond (1935) as Soldier (uncredited)
 Springtime in the Rockies (1937) as Cowhand at Dance (uncredited)
 The Purple Vigilantes (1938) as Gambler (uncredited)
 The Old Barn Dance (1938) as Rider (uncredited)
 The Lone Ranger (1938, Serial) as Jim Clark
 Outlaws of Sonora (1938) as Bank Teller (uncredited)
 Gold Mine in the Sky (1938) as Cowhand (uncredited)
 Under Western Stars (1938) as Cowhand (uncredited)
 Army Girl (1938) as Soldier (uncredited)
 Pals of the Saddle (1938) as Rider (uncredited)
 Billy the Kid Returns (1938) as Henchman (uncredited)
 Come On, Rangers (1938) as Ranger in Black Hat (uncredited)
 Hawk of the Wilderness (1938) as Tom (uncredited)
 Shine On, Harvest Moon (1938) as Rustler (uncredited)
 The Mysterious Miss X (1939) as Policeman (uncredited)
 I Was a Convict (1939) as Prison Guard (uncredited)
 Rough Riders' Round-up (1939) as Patrolman Joe (uncredited)
 Southward Ho (1939) (uncredited)
 The Night Riders (1939) as Mob Member (uncredited)
 Frontier Pony Express (1939) as Lieutenant Harris (uncredited)
 Man of Conquest (1939) as Young Lieutenant, Jackson Aide (uncredited)
 S.O.S. Tidal Wave (1939) (uncredited)
 In Old Caliente (1939) as Curly Henchman (uncredited)
 Wall Street Cowboy (1939) as Cowhand (uncredited)
 In Old Monterey (1939) as Soldier (uncredited)
 The Arizona Kid (1939) as Soldier (uncredited)
 Saga of Death Valley (1939) as Henchman (uncredited)
 South of the Border (1939) as Bandit (uncredited)
 The Cisco Kid and the Lady (1939) as Tommy Bates
 Star Dust (1940) as Ronnie
 Young People (1940) as Mike Shea
 Charter Pilot (1940) as Charlie Crane
 Jennie (1940) as Franz Schermer
 The Cowboy and the Blonde (1941) as Lank Garrett
 Accent on Love (1941) as John Worth Hyndman
 Last of the Duanes (1941) as Buck Duane
 Riders of the Purple Sage (1941) as Jim Lassiter
 Cadet Girl (1941) as Tex Mallory
 Roxie Hart (1942) as Homer Howard
 Ten Gentlemen from West Point (1942) as Joe Dawson
 Orchestra Wives (1942) as Bill Abbot
 China Girl (1942) as Johnny Williams
 Coney Island (1943) as Eddie Johnson
 Bomber's Moon (1943) as Capt. Jeffrey Dakin
 Survival of the Fittest (1944) as a downed USAAF pilot
 Three Little Girls in Blue (1946) as Van Damm Smith
 The Brasher Doubloon (1947) as Philip Marlowe
 Lulu Belle (1948) as George Davis
 The Girl from Manhattan (1948) as Rev. Tom Walker
 Belle Starr's Daughter (1948) as Marshal Tom Jackson
 Davy Crockett, Indian Scout (1950) as Davy Crockett
 Dakota Lil (1950) as Tom Horn / Steve Garrett
 The Iroquois Trail (1950) as Nat Cutler / Hawkeye
 The Sword of Monte Cristo (1951) as Captain Renault
 The Texas Rangers (1951) as Johnny Carver
 Indian Uprising (1952) as Capt Chas McCloud
 Cripple Creek (1952) as Bret Ivers
 The Pathfinder (1952) as Pathfinder
 Jack McCall, Desperado (1953) as Jack McCall
 Fort Ti (1953) as Capt. Jed Horn
 Gun Belt (1953) as Billy Ringo
 Battle of Rogue River (1954) as Maj. Frank Archer
 The Lone Gun (1954) as Cruze
 Masterson of Kansas (1954) as Bat Masterson
 Studio One in Hollywood (1955, episode "The Conviction of Peter Sea") as Bakeland
 Seminole Uprising (1955) as Lt. Carn Elliott
 Robbers' Roost (1955) as Jim 'Tex' Wall
 Stage 7 (1955, episode "The Traveling Salesman") as Dan Kelly
 General Electric Theater (1955, episode "The Return of Gentleman Jim") as Gentleman Jim Corbett
 Screen Directors Playhouse (1956, episode "Claire") as Dr. Stanley Wayne
 Canyon River (1956) as Steve Patrick
 Huk! (1956) as Greg Dickson
 Jane Wyman Presents The Fireside Theatre (1956, episode "Ten Percent") as Mark Weston
 The Ford Television Theatre (1957, episode "The Quiet Stranger") as Daniel McKee
 Last of the Badmen (1957) as Dan Barton
 Gun Duel in Durango (1957) as Dan
 Street of Sinners (1957) as John Dean
 Pawnee (1957) as Paul 'Pale Arrow' Fletcher
 Black Patch (1957) as Marshal Clay Morgan
 General Electric Theater (1957, episode "Thousand Dollar Gun") as Buchanan Smith
 Wagon Train (1958, episode "The Jesse Cowan Story") as Jesse Cowan
 Man from God's Country (1958) as Dan Beattie
 The Toughest Gun in Tombstone (1958) Captain Matt Sloane
 Cimarron City (1958–1959, TV Series) as Mayor Matt Rockford
 Badman's Country (1958) as Pat Garrett
 Watusi (1959) as Harry Quartermain
 King of the Wild Stallions (1959) as Randy Burke
 Sea Hunt (1960, Season 3, Episode 4)
 The Steel Claw (1961, also director, writer, producer) as Capt. John Larsen
 Samar (1962, also director, writer, producer) as Dr. John David Saunders
 Hawaiian Eye (1963, episode "Boar Hunt") as Maitland
 Guerillas in Pink Lace (1964, also director, writer, producer) as Murphy
 Battle of the Bulge (1965) as Sgt. Duquesne
 Django the Condemned (1965) as Pat O'Brien
 Bonanza (1966, episode "The Code") as Dan Taggert
 I Spy (1966, episode "A Day Called 4 Jaguar") as Nicolai
 Hallucination Generation (1966) as Eric
 Bomb at 10:10 (1967) as Steve Corbit
 Hostile Guns (1967) as Sheriff Gid McCool
 Hell of Borneo (1967) as John Dirkson (shot in 1963)
 Warkill  (1968) as Col. John Hannegan
 Strangers at Sunrise (1969) as Grant Merrick
 Satan's Harvest (1969, also director, writer, producer) as Cutter Murdock
 Ride the Tiger (1970, TV Movie, also directed)
 Alias Smith and Jones (1971, episode "Jailbreak at Junction City") as Curt Clitterhouse
 NET Playhouse (1972, episode "Portrait of the Hero as a Young Man") as Christopher Gist
 The Leo Chronicles (1972)
 The Proud and the Damned (1972, producer)
 The Daredevil (1972) as Paul Tunney
 The Six Million Dollar Man (1974, episode "The Coward") as Christopher Bell / Garth
 The Odd Couple (1974, episode "The Hollywood Story") as Griff
 Blood, Money and Tears (1980)
 Children's Island (1984, TV Series) as The President
 Wild Wind (1985) as Major Nestorovic (final film role)

Bibliography
 Montgomery, George The Years of George Montgomery'' Sagebrush; 1st edition (1981)

References

External links

 

1916 births
2000 deaths
American male television actors
United States Army personnel of World War II
American people of German descent
American stunt performers
Burials at Forest Lawn Cemetery (Cathedral City)
First Motion Picture Unit personnel
Male actors from Montana
Male Western (genre) film actors
People from Greater Los Angeles
People from Pondera County, Montana
People from Rancho Mirage, California
United States Army soldiers
University of Montana alumni
20th Century Studios contract players
Western (genre) television actors
20th-century American male actors